Hypatopa erato is a moth in the family Blastobasidae. It is found in Costa Rica.

The length of the forewings is about 6.2 mm. The forewings are pale brown intermixed with brownish-orange and brown scales. The hindwings are translucent pale brown, gradually darkening towards the apex.

Etymology
The specific name refers to Erato, the Muse of lyric and love-poetry.

References

Moths described in 2013
Hypatopa